BJD may refer to:

 Ball-jointed doll
 Ballyjamesduff, a town in Ireland
 Barycentric Julian Date, a time correction in astronomy
 Biju Janata Dal, a political party in India
 Bovine Johne's Disease or paratuberculosis
 Bratislava Jazz Days, a jazz festival in Slovakia
 Bridget Jones's Diary, a 1996 novel by Helen Fielding
 Bridget Jones's Diary (film)
 British Journal of Dermatology